Corbridge Bridge is a 17th-century stone bridge across the River Tyne at Corbridge, Northumberland, England.

It is listed as a Grade I building by Historic England.

History
The bridge at Corbridge was built in 1235. In 1298 royal officers went to Corbridge to purchase horseshoes and nails, and the tariff imposed to raise money for upkeep of the medieval bridge included tolls on nails of different kinds, horseshoes, cartwheel-sheaths, griddles, iron cauldrons and vats. The bridge was the great asset of the town. Described in 1306 as the only bridge between Newcastle and Carlisle, it was maintained also as a link between England and Scotland. In 1674 [Fraser has 1690] it was replaced by the seven-arched bridge we see today. So well did the builder of this bridge execute his contract that his was the only one on the Tyne to withstand the Great Flood of 1771. In 1881 it was widened by  but its appearance was not spoilt.

References

External links

Bridges in Northumberland
Crossings of the River Tyne
Grade I listed bridges
Grade I listed buildings in Northumberland
bridge